Bekka & Billy was an American country music duo consisting of singer-songwriters Bekka Bramlett and Billy Burnette, who first worked together as members of Fleetwood Mac. Their eponymous debut album was released by Almo Sounds in April 1997. While their debut single, "Patient Heart," failed to chart in the United States, it reached No. 96 on the RPM Country Tracks chart in Canada.

Entertainment Weekly gave Bekka & Billy a B rating, saying that if "Patient Heart" didn't become a big hit, Nashville was "asleep at the wheel." AllMusic gave their album three stars, calling the duo "tailor made for stardom." Vince Gill played guitar on the album, which featured a song written by Delaney Bramlett.

The duo went their separate ways in January 1998.

Discography

Studio albums

Singles

Music videos

References

American country music groups
Country music duos
Musical groups established in 1997
Almo Sounds artists
Musical groups disestablished in 1998
Fleetwood Mac